Maj 'e Shën Mërtirit is a Peninsula in Albania. It is located in the prefecture of Vlorë County, in the southern part of the country, 140 km south of the country capital, Tirana.

The terrain of Maja 'e Shën is hilly in the southeast and mountains in the north. Very few people live in this area. Mountains and lakes are very common in the area of Maja 'e Shën Mërtirit.

The climate of Maja 'e Shën Mërtirit is temperate.

References

Geography of Vlorë County
Peninsulas of Albania
Pages translated from Swedish Wikipedia